Big Generator is the twelfth studio album by English progressive rock band Yes, released on 21 September 1987 by Atco Records. After touring in support of their previous album, 90125 (1983), which saw the band move from progressive rock towards a pop-oriented and commercially accessible direction, Yes started work on a follow-up in 1985 with producer Trevor Horn. It was a laborious album to make; recording began at Carimate, Italy, but internal and creative differences resulted in production to resume in London, where Horn ended his time with the band due to continuing problems. The album was completed in Los Angeles in 1987 by Trevor Rabin and producer Paul DeVilliers.

Big Generator received some mixed reviews from music critics, and the album reached number 15 on the Billboard 200 and number 17 on the UK Albums Chart. In April 1988, the album was certified platinum by the Recording Industry Association of America (RIAA) for selling one million copies in the US. Like 90125, it was nominated for a Grammy Award for Best Rock Performance by a Duo or Group with Vocal. The album spawned two singles, "Love Will Find a Way" and "Rhythm of Love". Yes supported Big Generator with a tour of North America and Japan from November 1987 to April 1988, after which Anderson again left the group. The album was reissued in 2009 with bonus tracks.

Background
In February 1985, the Yes line-up of Jon Anderson, bassist Chris Squire, keyboardist Tony Kaye, drummer Alan White, and guitarist and vocalist Trevor Rabin, ended a twelve-month world tour in support of their eleventh studio album, 90125 (1983). That album marked a considerable change in direction for the group, moving from their pioneering progressive rock sound of the 1970s towards more accessible and pop-oriented music, helped by the production of Trevor Horn and Rabin's demos, which formed most of the album. 90125 became the band's highest selling album, helped by their first and only US number one single "Owner of a Lonely Heart". The album also earned Yes's only Grammy Award, winning Best Rock Instrumental Performance for "Cinema".

Rehearsals began in Hollywood, California in August 1985 with Horn resuming his role as producer. Rabin felt nervous and pressured when their label, Atco Records, informed him that they wished for another hit like "Owner of a Lonely Heart", but he wanted to move from the band's past and do something different regardless of its success. Anderson, wishing to "extend the musicianship" of the band and its new music, wanted to capitalise on its now larger fanbase and attempt "more adventurous" songs for the album. Horn was not interested, however, and isolated Anderson from the writing process until songs were near complete. Anderson called it a "big mistake" as he wanted to encourage Rabin to "jump on a Stravinsky-ism" and "go crazy wild" with musical ideas. Kaye recalled that the band had no preconceived ideas, that Rabin had amassed lots of songs, many of which were already arranged and had lyrics, but did not force them upon the group because he wanted the writing to be a group effort. Kaye had little interest in songs based on improvisation.

The album's title derived from a quote from the band's concert film, 9012Live (1985). During one of the colourised segments at the end of the film, one of the actors says "It's the rhythm of big generators", which stuck with the group.

Recording

At the beginning of the songwriting process, Rabin recalled the group used Abbey Road (1969) by The Beatles as a model and influence for the music on Big Generator. He explained: "If we come up with an idea, why pressure ourselves into making it a song? Just have it there. If you can't come up with a chorus, don't throw it out because it's not a complete song and don't put a bad chorus around it". Such an approach led to the album having tracks longer than common pop songs of the time, peaking at seven minutes in length. Rabin said Kaye had a greater role on Big Generator than he had on 90125, but continual clashes between Kaye and Horn resulted in his keyboard parts recorded in a studio away from Horn. Despite this, Rabin still played "a lot" of keyboards on the album.

Kaye's main instrument on the album was the Korg DW-8000, which was able to faithfully recreate a Hammond organ and piano. He also used a Roland D-50, and a custom built Oberheim DPX-1 with hard disk capability. The group used what Kaye described as "the most sophisticated, most expensive" Synclavier system which was placed in a room of its own above the main studio. The basic keyboard parts and overdubs were recorded by feeding tracks from the main studio to the Synclavier, where Kaye would play his part, and the tracks fed back down to tape in the main studio. White was experimenting with sound designer and technologist Reek Havoc on the Dynacord ADD-One drum machine and pads.

At Rabin's suggestion, the band agreed to record at Lark Recording Studios, a facility situated by Castello di Carimate, a castle in Carimate, Italy. He thought that such a location would help the band bond together and bring some new ideas to the music which would create a better album as a result. Rabin first spoke of the friction between Anderson and Squire during this time three years after the album's release, which suited him as it "created a great vacuum for me to work in". Squire maintained that Rabin made the choice to record there as a step to save money and for tax purposes, and called it the wrong move, a view that Rabin denied years later and clarified that "It was never the intention to save money, although I don't want to waste money." Squire recalled more time being spent on what recording equipment to use than the music itself during the entire project, which also affected the tense situation. 

After three months in Carimate, most of the backing tracks had been put down but progress on the album was affected by internal problems. Rabin recalled a lot of partying going on and not enough substantial work getting done, calling it "a real drug time" which affected unnamed members to focus on work. This led to Horn suggesting they halt production and resume in London. For the next several months, recording took place at SARM East, SARM West, and AIR Studios in London. However, when the move was not enough to improve internal relations and differences in the album's direction, Rabin felt it was time to relocate the recording once more, this time to Los Angeles where he had settled, when he once entered the studio by himself on a Sunday to work, and later found it the happiest time of the entire experience. While in London, Horn found himself unable to finish producing the tracks as the band could not agree and ended his association with the project, adding: "It wasn't a case of being a committee. It was just warring factions trying to kill each other". Rabin later revealed that Horn's departure was also partly due to his differences with Anderson and Kaye.

Having failed to finish the album in London, Rabin returned home to Los Angeles and completed it at Southcombe, Westlake, and Sunset Sound Studios with producer and engineer Paul DeVilliers, who was their sound engineer on the 90125 tour. Rabin also worked at his 24-track facility at his home in the Hollywood Hills, which inspired him to work on all future musical projects in the studio, which he later named The Jacaranda Room. Rabin estimated the album cost $2 million to make.

Songs

Side one
The idea behind "Rhythm of Love" is, according to Rabin, "just sex". By the time of the recording, he felt Yes had pushed away from the cosmic-inspired lyrics that the group were known for in the 1970s with "Owner of a Lonely Heart", and thought a sex lyric would be a "nice little tease". Anderson claimed the group were strong for its chorus, but he felt unsure and needed the lyrics "fashioned" and changed some words.

"Big Generator" is one of the album's three tracks credited to the whole group. It developed from a riff by Squire and Rabin, originating from a specific tuning Squire had on his 5-string bass which helped to create the song, which involved contributions from White on the drums. In its early development, White felt the song needed some "Yes stamps" incorporated into the arrangement, and instructed the group to play a section and not listen to his playing. "I just stopped and started ... like the drummer fell off his stool and then got back on trying to catch up the beat. Playing very slowly and then faster ... and then I was back in time". Once he was, "I reversed the beat around backwards so I came in with the bass drum on two and four instead of one and three".

"Shoot High Aim Low", the second group track, was one of the songs recorded in Carimate, and features reverb that was captured naturally around the castle's acoustics, rather than reverb added electronically in the studio. White came up with the chords while he was playing in the studio with the drum box. When Rabin arrived at the studio, he told White to continue playing the beat while he started singing a melody that was used in the song. It features Anderson as "the guy in the helicopter going in at ninety miles an hour and I'm going to blow everybody up", yet has Rabin's backing vocals sing a love lyric that involves a couple enjoying their company in a car. He summarised the song's message as "To live beyond war". Rabin later called the song his favourite on Big Generator.

Rabin called "Almost Like Love" a track that did not quite work in the end and wished it was not included on the album. He disagreed with the addition of a horn section, comparing it to soul music and "Sussudio" by Phil Collins. Squire was particularly into the song's riff, yet Rabin felt the song around it was substandard, like "polishing a vase while the building was falling down".

Side two
"Love Will Find a Way" is solely credited to Rabin. He had originally worked on the music and lyrics with singer-songwriter Stevie Nicks and was close to recording it with her, but White heard the song and suggested Yes record it for Big Generator. Rabin was a fan of the song's title lyric, and particularly enjoyed conducting the orchestral arrangement at the beginning. However, he found that some fans thought the song was too far from what Yes music stood for.

Rabin enjoyed working on the production and arrangement for "Final Eyes", but deemed it a particularly difficult song to make, owing to its many changes in mood and style, yet he liked the acoustic guitar with Anderson's vocals. He said parts of the song make him cringe, because it sounds too much like Journey which he felt did not suit Yes.

"I'm Running" is the last of three group-written tracks, and was recorded at SARM Studios in London. When a take had been put down, Rabin recalled, White's drum tracks were deemed unusable, leaving him to re-record his parts "note for note". Rabin took a riff that Squire had come up with, which made Squire uncomfortable, but developed a guitar part that had a Latin flavour. He was not completely happy with the song, but thought its strange quality made him like it.

"Holy Lamb (Song for Harmonic Convergence)" is an Anderson song and deals with Harmonic Convergence, one of the world's first synchronised meditation events that occurred in August 1987 that raised awareness of a specific alignment of the planets at that time. Anderson had met some spiritual people during a visit to Las Vegas several years prior to writing it, and told him that he would be singing about it. Rabin later wished to have improved the song by adding an opening and closing section to the track, similar to what Yes had done with "Soon", the final section of "The Gates of Delirium".

Artwork
"Jon Anderson had an idea for that sleeve, which was basically a drawing of a scroll," designer Garry Mouat (who had worked on 90125) told Classic Rock. "It was like something you may have done at school. I remember saying, 'I like where you're coming from, but how about another idea?' The band were all looking out of the windows, avoiding eye contact and leaving me to pay lip service to Jon."

Release and reception

Released on 21 September 1987, Big Generator peaked at number 15 on the Billboard 200 during its 30 weeks on the chart, and at number 17 on the UK Albums Chart.

On 8 December 1987, it was certified gold by the Recording Industry Association of America (RIAA) for selling 500,000 copies in the US. On 29 April 1988, it was certified platinum for selling one million copies. Like 90125, the album earned Yes a Grammy Award nomination for Best Rock Performance by a Duo or Group with Vocal.

Musician reviewer J. D. Considine wrote simply: "Just say no."

Two singles were released from the album. "Love Will Find a Way", the first, reached number one on the Billboard Mainstream Rock chart and number 30 on the Billboard Hot 100. The second, "Rhythm of Love", peaked at number 40 on the latter chart.

Big Generator was remastered in 2009 by Japanese engineer Isao Kikuchi and released in Japan by Warner Music Japan as part of a series of Yes reissues on Super High Material CD. This mastering reappeared in the 2013 box set The Studio Albums 1969–1987.

Tour and aftermath
Yes supported Big Generator with a tour of North America and Japan from November 1987 to April 1988. The band adopted a low-key approach for the 1987 dates as they had spent so much time in studio and wanted to start touring and try out their new material. In early 1988, six shows were cancelled after Rabin collapsed backstage following a concert in Tampa, Florida due to exhaustion from performing with the flu and a fever.

Following their appearance at the Atlantic Records 40th Anniversary concert in May 1988, Anderson left the group and formed Anderson Bruford Wakeman Howe, which reduced Yes to a four-piece.

Track listing

Personnel
Credits are adapted from the album's liner notes.

Yes
 Jon Anderson – vocals
 Trevor Rabin – vocals, acoustic and electric guitars, keyboards, string arrangements
 Tony Kaye – keyboards
 Chris Squire – bass guitar, backing vocals
 Alan White – drums, percussion, backing vocals

Additional musicians
 Lee R. Thornburg – horns on "Almost Like Love"
 Nick Lane – horns on "Almost Like Love"
 Greg Smith – horns on "Almost Like Love"
 Jimmy Zavala – horns on "Almost Like Love", harmonica on "Love Will Find a Way"

Production

 Yes – production
 Trevor Horn – production
 Trevor Rabin – production, mixing
 Paul De Villiers – production, engineering
 Alan Goldberg – engineering at Lark Recording Studios
 Dave Meegan – engineering
 John Jacobs – engineering
 Paul Massey – engineering
 David Glover – engineering
 Mike "Spike" Drake – assistant engineer
 Stuart Breed – assistant engineer

 Brian Soucy – assistant engineer
 Lois Oki – assistant engineer
 Julie Last – assistant engineer
 Jimmy Preziosi – assistant engineer
 Mike Kloster – assistant engineer
 Kim Bullard – keyboard programming
 Stephen Marcussen – mastering

Charts

Weekly charts

Year-end charts

Certifications

References

Books
 
 

1987 albums
Yes (band) albums
Atlantic Records albums
Albums produced by Trevor Horn
Albums produced by Trevor Rabin
Albums recorded at Sunset Sound Recorders